Torre Titania is the twelfth-tallest skyscraper in Madrid, Spain and has become the country's largest mall.

Construction began in mid-2007, after the burning of the Windsor Tower, which formerly occupied the site. The interior, which houses stores El Corte Inglés, was completed in October 2011, and the facade in late 2013.

References 

Skyscrapers in Madrid
Commercial buildings completed in 2013
Skyscraper office buildings in Madrid
Buildings and structures in Cuatro Caminos neighborhood, Madrid